The Farmers State Bank is a historic commercial building at 1001 Front Street in Conway, Arkansas.  It is a two-story masonry structure in the Classical Revival style.  Its side walls are finished in brick, and most of its facade is in stone.  The dominant feature of the facade are four massive engaged Tuscan columns, which support an entablature, cornice, and parapet.  The main entrance is set in the central bay, with a bracketed hood above.  It was designed by Thompson & Harding and built about 1918.

The building was listed on the National Register of Historic Places in 1982.

See also
National Register of Historic Places listings in Faulkner County, Arkansas

References

Bank buildings on the National Register of Historic Places in Arkansas
Neoclassical architecture in Arkansas
Commercial buildings completed in 1918
Buildings and structures in Conway, Arkansas
National Register of Historic Places in Faulkner County, Arkansas
Historic district contributing properties in Arkansas